James Marsh is an English visual artist, illustrator and designer. He studied design and display at the Batley College of Art & Design, and graduated with an National Diploma in Design and college diplomas. He is also a founding member of the Association of Illustrators.

Notable works by Marsh include Time magazine covers, neo-surreal cover paintings for paperback reprints of Ross Macdonald books, cover art for all of the studio albums released by the English band Talk Talk, and his gatefold artwork for Jamiroquai's chart-topping debut album, Emergency on Planet Earth, in 1993.

In 1982, he first appeared in Who's Who in Graphic Art, published by Graphis Press in Zurich, Switzerland. In 1991, his first book, Bizarre Birds & Beasts, was published by Pavilion Books (UK) and Penguin Books (US). In 2003, The Independent newspaper named him one of the "Top Ten Leading British Illustrators". From 2012 to 2014, Marsh was invited to create the branding for the Transmusicales festival in Rennes, France. In 2015, Marsh was inducted into the Album Cover Hall of Fame in the US.

Bibliography
 The Cow Book (1983), compiled by Marc Gallant, illustrated by Marc Gallant, Wayne Anderson, Keleck, James Marsh, Braldt Bralds, Yōko Ochida, Michel Guiré-Vaka, B. G. Sharma, Lidia Postma, Bushiri Mruta Awazi, Jean Christian Knaff, Luba Simansky, Binette Schroeder, Étienne Delessert, Martin Leman, Jocelyne Pache, Boris Vallejo, Claude Lapointe, Nicholas Price, Josef Paleček, Waldemar Świerzy, Ivan Generalić, Mark Hess, Alain Gauthier, Robert Giusti, and Robert Rodriguez, published by Alfred A. Knopf

References

External links

"Shedding Weight", Time magazine cover, 20 January 1986.

1946 births
Living people
English illustrators
Album-cover and concert-poster artists